The University of Koudougou (renamed Université Norbert Zongo) is one of three public universities in Burkina Faso. It is located in the city of Koudougou.  As of 2015/2016 it had the second highest enrollment of students nationally (16.2%) behind the University of Ouagadougou (renamed Université Ouaga 1 Professeur Joseph Ki-Zerbo, UO1-JKZ) which had 32.8% of the national total enrollment. The University Ouaga 2, the University of Bobo-Dioulasso (renamed Université Nazi Boni, UNB) and the "Institut des Sciences (IDS)" had 13.2%, 11.3%, and 1.9% of total university enrollment, respectively. The remaining 24.5% of enrollment are in private universities.  The university was founded in 2005 and in 2015/2016 had 15,346 students.;

Faculties
The university is divided into five faculties:;
Faculty of Higher Education (Ecole Normale Supérieure (ENS))
Faculty of Economics and Management (UFR Sciences Economiques et Gestion)
Faculty of Arts and Letters (UFR Lettres et Sciences Humaines)
University Institute of Technology (Institut Universitaire de Technologie)
Faculty of Science and Techniques ("UFR Sciences et Techniques")

2008-2009 Student Strike
During the 2008–2009 academic year there was a student strike at the university.

See also
Education in Burkina Faso

References

Universities and colleges in Burkina Faso
Educational institutions established in 2005
2005 establishments in Burkina Faso